Linear enamel hypoplasia is a failure of the tooth enamel to develop correctly during growth, leaving bands of reduced enamel on a tooth surface. It is the most common type of enamel hypoplasia reported in clinical and archaeological samples, with other types including plane-form enamel hypoplasia and pitting enamel hypoplasia.

Linear enamel hypoplasia can be caused by a variety of factors, from genetic conditions to malnutrition and illnesses during childhood.

References

Further reading 

 
[ page 403] in

External links 
 Enamel hypoplasia
 Medieval bioarchaeology
 Osteology
 Bioarchaeology

Teeth